Wise Girls is a 1929 American pre-Code comedy film directed by E. Mason Hopper and written by Margaret Booth, Elliott Nugent and J. C. Nugent. The film stars Elliott Nugent, Norma Lee, Roland Young, J. C. Nugent and Clara Blandick in her first talkie film. The film was released on September 29, 1929, by Metro-Goldwyn-Mayer.

Plot summary

Cast
 Elliott Nugent as Kempy
 Norma Lee as Kate Bence
 Roland Young as Duke Merrill
 J. C. Nugent as Dad
 Clara Blandick as Ma
 Marion Shilling as Ruth Bence
 Leora Spellman as Jane Wade
 James Donlan as Ben Wade

References

External links
 
 
 
 

1929 films
1920s English-language films
American comedy films
1929 comedy films
Metro-Goldwyn-Mayer films
Films directed by E. Mason Hopper
American black-and-white films
1920s American films